The 1992 season of the Torneo Descentralizado was the 77th season of the top category of Peruvian football (soccer). It was played by 16 teams. The national champions were Universitario.

Teams

Table

Standings

Title

Liguilla Pre-Libertadores

External links
RSSSF Peru 1992 by Eli Schmerler, Carlos Manuel Nieto Tarazona

Peruvian Primera División seasons
Peru
1